The 2019–20 Women's CEV Cup is the 48th edition of the European CEV Cup volleyball club tournament, the former "Top Teams Cup".

Format
The tournament is played on a knockout format, with 32 teams participating. Initially 27 teams were allocated direct vacancies to enter the competition, with another 5 teams joining the competition via Champions League qualification. On 26 June 2019, a drawing of lots in Luxembourg City, Luxembourg, determined the team's pairing for each match. Each team plays a home and an away match with result points awarded for each leg (3 points for 3–0 or 3–1 wins, 2 points for 3–2 win, 1 point for 2–3 loss). After two legs, the team with the most result points advances to the next round. The Golden Set winner is the team that first obtains 15 points, provided that the points difference between the two teams is at least 2 points (thus, the Golden Set is similar to a tiebreak set in a normal match).

Participating teams
Drawing of lots for the 32 participating teams was held in Luxembourg City, Luxembourg on 26 June 2019.
27 teams allocated vacancies spots and 5 teams qualified as Champions League qualification losers.

The number of participants on the basis of ranking list for European Cup Competitions:

Main phase

16th Finals

The match between Voléro Le Cannet and CSM București has been cancelled as a result of CSM București being banned from playing European cups for 3 years.

First leg

|}

Second leg

|}

8th Finals

|}

First leg

|}

Second leg

|}

4th Finals

|}

First leg

|}

Second leg

|}
The match between Unet e-work Busto Arsizio and Dinamo Kazan has been postponed due to the COVID-19 pandemic in Europe.

Final phase

Semifinals

|}

First leg

|}

Second leg

|}

Finals

|}

First leg

|}

Second leg

|}

References

External links
 2020 CEV Volleyball Cup - Women

Women's CEV Cup
CEV Cup
CEV Cup
CEV Cup